Nick von Niederhäusern (born 28 September 1989) is a Swiss footballer who currently plays for SC Young Fellows Juventus in the Swiss Challenge League.

Career

Club career
Von Niederhäuser went through his youth career at FC Wiesendangen and later at FC Winterthur. In December 2007 he made his debut in the first team of FC Winterthur, in a 3-1 away win against FC Lausanne-Sport. He was in the starting lineup and played all 90 minutes. During his time at FC Winterthur, he played a total of 137 games in the Swiss Challenge League and 8 games in the Swiss Cup.

In July 2013, he moved to league competitor FC Vaduz, with whom he helped with promotion to the Swiss Super League in his first season. In the same year he won the Liechtenstein Cup after beating USV Eschen/Mauren in the final. In 2015 he extended his contract with FC Vaduz for another year until 2016.

After one year in the United States with Reno 1868 FC, Von Niederhäuser moved back to Switzerland in January 2018, signing with FC Wil. After the first half of the 2019/20 season, he prematurely terminated his contract with FC Wil after he was last there as vice-captain. In February 2020, he moved to Swiss Challenge League club SC Young Fellows Juventus.

References

External links

1989 births
Living people
Swiss men's footballers
Swiss expatriate footballers
FC Winterthur players
FC Vaduz players
Swiss expatriate sportspeople in Liechtenstein
Expatriate footballers in Liechtenstein
Reno 1868 FC players
FC Wil players
SC Young Fellows Juventus players
Swiss Super League players
Swiss Challenge League players
Swiss Promotion League players
USL Championship players
Association football defenders
Swiss expatriate sportspeople in the United States
Expatriate soccer players in the United States